Batakara is a town and Union Council of Swabi District in Khyber Pakhtunkhwa province of Pakistan. It is located at 34°2'0N 72°36'0E with an altitude of 323 metres (1062 feet).

The city's ancient name was (Bee-rai) around four or five centuries ago. There once were, British residents in town, and various tribes have lived in the town. Later the name was changed from Bee-rai to Batakara. Nearby, there are the Tarbela Dam sea, desert, and many green farms. Batakara was once renowned for fishing and the special fish (Malah) was known throughout the region.

 The language of the local people is Pashto. Farming is the occupation of these people. Sugarcane, maize and wheat are cultivated mostly. The people here are hospitable and friendly. Mukkha is the traditional game and this game seems like Archery.

(Edited by Nouman Khan http://www.falconsofttechnologies.com/)

References

Populated places in Swabi District